The 5th Thailand National Games (Thai: กีฬาเขตแห่งประเทศไทย ครั้งที่ 5, also known as the 1971 National Games and 1971 Interprovincial Games) were held in Nakhon Sawan, Thailand from 2 to 9 December 1971, with contests in 13 sports. These games were the qualifications of Thai athletes for the 1971 Southeast Asian Peninsular Games held in Kualalumpur, Malaysia.

Participating regions
The 5th Thailand National Games represented 9 regions from 70 provinces.

Sports
The 1971 Thailand National Games featured 10 Olympic sports contested at the 1971 Southeast Asian Peninsular Games, 1974 Asian Games and 1972 Summer Olympics. In addition, four non-Olympic sports were featured: badminton, sepak takraw, table tennis and tennis.

See also
 1990 Thailand National Student Games
 1993 Thailand National Para Games
 1995 Thailand National Games
 1996 Thailand National Para Games
 1999 Thailand National Student Games
 2010 Thailand Sport School Games by Nakhon Sawan Sport School 
 2015 Thailand National Games
 2015 Thailand National Para Games

References

External links
 Sports Authority of Thailand (SAT)

National Games
Thailand National Games
National Games
Thailand National Games
National Games